The 1964 Lehigh Engineers football team was an American football team that represented Lehigh University during the 1964 NCAA College Division football season. Lehigh tied for last in both the Middle Atlantic Conference, University Division, and in the Middle Three Conference.

In their third and final year under head coach Mike Cooley, the Engineers compiled a 1–7–1 record. Charles Ortlam and Joe Weiss were the team captains.

At 0–3–1 against MAC University Division foes, Lehigh was one of three teams without a win in conference play, along with Hofstra (0–3–1), playing its first year in the division, and Lafayette (0–4–2). Lehigh went 0–1–1 against the Middle Three, losing to Rutgers and tying Lafayette.

Lehigh played its home games at Taylor Stadium on the university campus in Bethlehem, Pennsylvania.

Schedule

References

Lehigh
Lehigh
Lehigh Mountain Hawks football seasons
Lehigh Engineers football